Dezli may refer to:
 Dezli, Gilan, a village in Gilan Province, Iran
 Dezli, Kurdistan, a village in Kurdistan Province, Iran
 Dezli Rural District, a district in Kurdistan Province, Iran